Padmapuram Gardens is a tourist attraction in the Araku valley in Andhra Pradesh, India.

Location
The famed Padmapuram gardens are located in the beautiful and serene valley Araku. It is a short drive away from the railway station.

References

External links

 Indian Mirror - Tourism in the Araku Valley 
 The Red Earth of Araku Valley

Tourist attractions in Visakhapatnam
Gardens in India